Anita Gershman is an American film producer who has produced films since 1999.

Executive producer filmography
Rain (2003)
Perilous (2002) (TV)
Blind Obsession (2002)
Face Value (2002)
Night Class (2002)
On the Borderline (2001)
Facing the Enemy (2001)
Living in Fear (2001)
Spirit (2001) (TV)
Above & Beyond (2001) 
Malpractice (2001)
A Mother's Testimony (2001) (TV)
The Perfect Wife (2001) (TV)
She's No Angel (2001) (TV)
Can't Be Heaven (2000)
The Stepdaughter (2000)
Above Suspicion (2000)
Alone with a Stranger (2000)
The Perfect Nanny (2000)
Rites of Passage (1999)
Time Served (1999)
Her Married Lover (1999)
Stranger in My House (1999)

External links
 

American film producers
Living people
Year of birth missing (living people)